The Journal of Language Relationship (abbreviated JLR; Russian: Вопросы языкового родства) is a quarterly academic journal published in both Russia and the United States. It focuses on historical linguistics, with many articles relating to long-range comparative linguistics.

Overview
In 1998,  founded the journal in Moscow, Russia.

The journal is currently published by the Russian State University for the Humanities (RSUH) and the Institute of Linguistics of the Russian Academy of Sciences in Moscow, Russia, and by Gorgias Press in the United States.

The editorial board includes Heiner Eichner (chairman), William H. Baxter, Alexander Militarev, Valentin Vydrin, Václav Blažek, Murray Gell-Mann, Larry Hyman, Frederik Kortlandt, and James P. Mallory. Editors include Vladimir Dybo (editor-in-chief), George Starostin, Anna Dybo, and Ilya Yakubovich.

References

External links
  
 Official website in Russian

Historical linguistics journals
Quarterly journals
Paleolinguistics
Publications established in 2008
English-language journals
Russian-language journals
Paleoanthropology